Captain Lazarus Stewart (July 4, 1734 – July 3, 1778) was an 18th-century Pennsylvanian frontiersman, a leader of the Paxton Boys – a group of Scots-Irish militants who massacred a number of Conestoga Indians in 1763 – and was a prominent commander on the Yankee (i.e. Connecticut) side in the Pennamite–Yankee War. He met his death in battle with the Loyalists and Iroquois at the Battle of Wyoming.

Early life
Stewart was born in Hanover, Lancaster (now Dauphin) County, Pennsylvania. He was well-educated for the time and place, and was raised as a farmer.

Pontiac's War and Conestoga Massacre
During the summer of 1763, Indian raids fell heavily upon the western settlements of Pennsylvania. "Carlisle was become the barrier not a single Individual beyond it." In the crisis, the response of the State government was singularly dilatory. There had long been friction between the Presbyterian settlers of the frontier and the Quaker-dominated government, and the damage done by the Indians rankled. Colonel Rev. John Elder raised two companies of militia, known as the Paxton Boys, in Paxton Township, captained by Stewart and Asher Clayton.

Several enclaves of Indians existed to the east of the frontier, among the Moravians near Bethlehem and elsewhere. The nearest of these were the Susquehannock tribe at Conestoga Town. To the north, such anger was directed by the settlers against the Moravian Indians, for their suspected part in abetting Indian raids, that the Moravians were sent to be kept in protective custody in Philadelphia. In Lancaster County, feelings were very much aroused against the Susquehannocks, the more so after the Moravians were protected by the Commonwealth — whose authority the frontiersmen doubtless felt should be exerted for their protection against Indians and not vice versa. Col. Elder wrote to the government in September 1763, urging for the Susquehannocks to be removed to Philadelphia as well, but the proposal was declined.

In December 1763, Matthew Smith, one of the Paxton Boys, took a small scouting party to Conestoga Town to investigate reports of a hostile Indian being sheltered there. The party returned with tales of dozens of strange Indians occupying the town, and began to assemble a more substantial force. Col. Elder heard of the expedition, and sent a written message dissuading it, to no effect. On the morning of December 14, 1763, just before dawn, fifty armed and mounted Paxton Boys descended upon Conestoga Town, killed the six Indians they found there, and burned the town. While the Susquehannocks were probably in communication with hostile Indians on the frontier, the results of the Rangers' attack are hardly consonant with their supposed justification of harboring numerous hostile Indians.

Fourteen of the Susquehannocks had been elsewhere when the massacre occurred, and were removed to the workhouse in Lancaster for protection. Lazarus Stewart and Smith, asserting that one of those fourteen was known as a murderer, assembled the Paxton Boys again. Ignoring Col. Elder, who now remonstrated with them in person, they descended upon Lancaster on December 27, 1763 and broke into the workhouse. Matthew Smith later claimed that the intent of the raid had been to carry off the single murderous Indian, but the Paxton Boys, in short order, butchered the fourteen unfortunate Susquehannocks. These incidents became known as the Conestoga Massacre.

The shocked government ordered the arrest of those who took part in the massacre, but to no avail. Even those who had opposed the massacres, such as Col. Elder (who was removed from his command and replaced by Maj. Asher Clayton), did not volunteer the names of the ringleaders to the government. The Paxton Boys capped their efforts with a march to Philadelphia (whence the remaining Indians in the state had been removed) in January 1764. While they obtained few concrete concessions, neither Stewart nor any of the other participants in the massacre were prosecuted for their deeds.

Yankee-Pennamite War
Stewart had no love for the Commonwealth of Pennsylvania, and in January 1770, he led thirty-nine militiamen from Lancaster County to the Wyoming Valley. At the time, settlers from Connecticut were contesting the possession of the area with the Pennsylvanians, in a struggle that became the first of the Pennamite Wars. Captain Zebulon Butler was able to recruit Stewart and his men for the Connecticut, or Yankee, side, encouraging them with the promise of land in Hanover Township. Stewart's band, reinforced by ten Yankees, recaptured Fort Durkee from the Pennamites on February 12, 1770. One of his soldiers, Baltzer Stage or Stagard, was the first man to be killed in the conflict, when the Pennamites under Captain Ogden unsuccessfully attempted to retake the fort in March.

On September 24, 1770, a surprise assault by the Pennamites retook Fort Durkee, but Stewart escaped and fled southward. He was arrested two weeks later in York, Pennsylvania, but escaped at night. He returned to Lancaster County and assembled twenty-five of the Paxton Boys, who retook Fort Durkee by ambush on December 18, 1770. On January 21, 1771, a Pennamite force led by Ogden returned to construct Fort Wyoming and besiege Fort Durkee, but their demand that Fort Durkee be surrendered was met with gunfire. There was one casualty, Ogden's brother Nathaniel. Fearing arrest for murder, and outnumbered by the Pennamites, Stewart and his troops slipped away in the night and fled to Connecticut. The victorious Pennamites destroyed Fort Durkee and took possession of the area.

In July 1771, one hundred men under Captains Butler and Stewart returned to the Wyoming Valley to lay siege to Fort Wyoming. Captain Ogden slipped through the lines at night to raise a relief column in Philadelphia. The relief force was ambushed by the Yankees and lost their baggage and supplies. After a month-long siege, Fort Wyoming capitulated on August 15, 1771, and there would be peace in the Wyoming Valley for the next four years, in which Stewart and his militiamen could enjoy the cultivation of the lands granted them for their military services. He and his wife, Martha Espy raised a family of seven children here.

The war resumed in August 1775, when a strong Pennsylvania force of seven hundred men under Colonel William Plunkett was dispatched to the area. They defeated the outnumbered Yankees in September, and drove out the settlers on the west bank of the Susquehanna River. Connecticut was able to raise four hundred men, under Zebulon Butler (now a colonel), and the confrontation took place at Christmas in conditions of heavy snow. Captain Stewart, with twenty men, ambushed the Pennsylvania column at Rampart Rocks on December 24, 1775 and caused them to flee back to their camp. The next day, he and his company attacked the Pennamites as they attempted to cross the river into Wilkes-Barre under cover of darkness, and broke up their attack. After an unsuccessful attack by the Pennamites on the Yankee positions at Rampart Rocks, Plunkett's column withdrew. By now, the attention of both parties was fixed upon a greater theater of war, the American Revolution.

Revolutionary War
In late June 1778, a strong force of Loyalist troops and Iroquois under Major John Butler approached the Wyoming Valley. Lieutenant Colonel Zebulon Butler, home on leave from the Continental Army at the time, was chosen to lead the militia which assembled at Forty Fort. Colonel Butler favored delay, as reinforcements might be expected from Philadelphia and other local forts. However, Captain Stewart (who had been given command of the company of men from Hanover Township) and others argued that they should immediately attack and drive off the enemy before they could be besieged in Forty Fort. Their counsel carried the day, and the militia marched out on July 3, 1778. They encountered the Loyalist and Indian forces a few miles away. During the Battle of Wyoming, a flanking maneuver by the Iroquois panicked the militia as they attempted to reform their line, and utterly routed them. Captain Stewart and his cousin, Lieutenant Lazarus Stewart, Jr. were both killed in the fight. The troops wounded and taken prisoner were tortured and killed in what is commonly known as the Wyoming Massacre.

After hearing of the defeat, Stewart's wife and children fled down the Susquehanna, and remained in Lancaster County until the close of the war.

References

1734 births
1778 deaths
United States military personnel killed in the American Revolutionary War
People of colonial Pennsylvania
People of Pennsylvania in the American Revolution
People of Pennsylvania of Pontiac's War
People from Dauphin County, Pennsylvania